Sir Worthington Laming Worthington-Evans, 1st Baronet,  (23 August 1868 – 14 February 1931) was a British Conservative politician.

Background and education
Born Laming Evans, he was the son of Worthington Evans and Susanah Laming. He assumed the prefix surname of Worthington by Royal Licence in 1916, although he had been calling himself Worthington Evans (without a hyphen) for many years. He trained as a solicitor.

Military career
Worthington-Evans was commissioned into the part-time 2nd Middlesex Artillery Volunteers in 1891 and was promoted Lieutenant in 1893 and Captain in 1897. He served as temporary Major in the First World War.

Political career 
Worthington-Evans unsuccessfully contested the Colchester constituency in 1906. He won the seat in January 1910.

Worthington-Evans was made a Baronet, of Colchester in the County of Essex, in 1916. He served in David Lloyd George's coalition government as Parliamentary Secretary to the Ministry of Munitions from 1916 to 1918, and as Minister of Blockade (not a member of the small wartime War Cabinet) in 1918.

In 1919 he was sworn of the Privy Council, and served in Lloyd George's Cabinet as Minister of Pensions from 1919 to 1920, as Minister without Portfolio from 1920 to 1921 and as Secretary of State for War from 1921 to 1922. Whilst Worthington-Evans was Secretary of State for War he famously said "If the Arab population realised that the peaceful control of Mesopotamia (Iraq) ultimately depends on our intention of bombing women and children, I’m very doubtful if we shall gain that acquiescence of the fathers and husbands of Mesopotamia to which the Secretary of State for the Colonies (Winston Churchill) looks forward." He was a member of the British delegation that negotiated the Anglo-Irish Treaty. He was one of the British delegates to the International Economic Conference at Genoa in 1922. He was appointed a GBE in 1922.

As with many Cabinet Ministers in the Lloyd George Coalition, Worthington-Evans declined office in Bonar Law's new government when Lloyd George fell in October 1922. Alone amongst the "Coalition Conservatives" he accepted an invitation the following May when Law retired and was succeeded by Stanley Baldwin. He served under Baldwin as Postmaster General between May 1923 and January 1924. He also served on various Cabinet Committees, including those relating to Northern Ireland and Unemployment. He became chairman of the latter in August 1923.

Worthington-Evans also served in Baldwin's second government (1924-29) as Secretary of State for War. He was a member of several Conservative and Unionist Party committees including the Policy committee which he chaired in 1927.

At the 1929 United Kingdom general election he transferred to the London seat of Westminster St George's. His death caused the 1931 Westminster St George's by-election at which the seat was won by Duff Cooper, a result seen as an endorsement of the continued leadership of Stanley Baldwin.

Family
He married Gertrude Hale in 1898 and had one son and one daughter. He died in February 1931, aged 62, and was succeeded in the baronetcy by his son, William. The papers of Worthington-Evans (from 1895 to 1931) are held at the Bodleian Library, University of Oxford.

Sources
Who Was Who
Dictionary of National Biography

External links 

  

Bodleian Library, holdings of personal papers
Laming Worthington-Evans on 'How to Vote at the Election' - sound recording from the British Library

1868 births
1931 deaths
Conservative Party (UK) MPs for English constituencies
Royal Artillery officers
Members of the Privy Council of the United Kingdom
British Secretaries of State
Secretaries of State for War (UK)
United Kingdom Postmasters General
Knights Grand Cross of the Order of the British Empire
UK MPs 1910
UK MPs 1910–1918
UK MPs 1918–1922
UK MPs 1922–1923
UK MPs 1923–1924
UK MPs 1924–1929
UK MPs 1929–1931
Worthington-Evans, Laming, 1st Baronet
British Army personnel of World War I